Waldwisse (Lorraine Franconian: Waldwiss/Wiiss) is a commune in the Moselle department in Grand Est in north-eastern France.

Localities of the commune: Betting, Gongelfang, Henting (German: Bettingen, Gongelfangen, Hintingerhof).

Population

See also
 Communes of the Moselle department

References

External links
 

Communes of Moselle (department)